Russia in Revolution: An Empire in Crisis, 1890 to 1928  is a narrative history of the Russian Revolution, Civil War, and the early history of the Soviet Union, written by S. A. Smith and published in 2017 by Oxford University Press. The release was timed with the 100th anniversary of the Russian Revolution.

Synopsis
The book covers the period from 18901928, a wider time frame than many works on the Russian Revolution. This reflects the author's intention to understand the Russian Revolution as a long term process, rather than focus on the narrower events of 1917 as exceptional.

The work addresses many major themes and topics that the revolution grew from, including:
 The process by which the working classes were radicalized. 
 The role of empire, transnational influences, and national identities played in the revolution and civil war.
 The process that took the Bolsheviks from being a small faction in Russian socialist politics to the dominant and eventually exclusive ruling party of the former Russian Empire.
 The differences and complex dynamics within and between the different factions and parties aligned with Russian Marxism and European socialism. 
 The role violence played in the Bolsheviks assuming and maintaining power. 
 How the national experience of World War I and the Civil War shaped the revolution.
 Issues related to religion and apocalyptic thought and how this influenced revolutionary thinking.

The book opens with an introduction which details the author's perspectives and the questions they are seeking to answer. The first chapter provides an overview of the half century preceding the main events of the book until the 1905 Revolution, looking at the reigns of Alexander II and III, and the beginning of Nicolas II's reign and concludes as Stalinism emerges during Stalin's consolidation of power and the end of the New Economic Policy, setting the stage for the era of central planning, collectivization, and industrialization. The structure of the book is both chronological and topical: 
 The first chapter is background; 
 The second chapter is a social history of Russia on the eve of World War I; 
 The third chapter covers the February Revolution, the period of Dual Power, and the October Revolution; 
 The fourth chapter is a survey of the civil war; 
 Finally, chapters 57 are a political-social-economic history of War Communism and the New Economic Policy era and the consolidation and expansion of Bolshevik power.
The work concludes with an essay reflecting on the causes and turning points of the Russian Revolution. 

There is no formal bibliography, however the extensive notes form a valuable resource on the scholarly writing about the period.

Reception
James D. White writes about Russia in Revolution, "It is a work written mainly for the general reader, though the author hopes that, as a synthesis of recent research by Russian and Western scholars, and as an attempt to question some familiar interpretations, it will have something of interest to say to his academic colleagues. In this, Smith’s hope is entirely justified, because his book not only provides a useful introduction to the subject, but raises important questions of how the revolutionary period in Russia should be interpreted."

Commenting in the English Historical Review on the scholarly but accessible writing, George Gilbert states, "The centenary of the Russian Revolution has, perhaps rather inevitably, invited a wave of new books on the subject, some of them containing much novel material for those engaged at the cutting edge of historical research, with others aimed at a more general readership. S.A. Smith’s contribution to the debate bridges a divide between specialist academic monographs and studies of the Revolution designed to engage a wide audience, with the book "primarily written for the reader coming new to the subject.""

Academic reviews

Release information
 Hardcover: 2017 (First Edition), Oxford University Press, 448pp. .
 Paperback: 2018 (First Edition), Oxford University Press, 480pp. .
 Audiobook: 2018, narrated by Derek Perkins, Audible Studios, 16 hours and 17 minutes.

Similar or related works
 A People's Tragedy by Orlando Figes (1997).
 Russia in Flames: War, Revolution, Civil War, 1914–1921 by Laura Engelstein (2017).
 The Russian Revolution: A New History by Sean McMeekin (2017).

About the author

See also
 Bibliography of the Russian Revolution and Civil War
 Eastern Front (World War I)
 Soviet grain procurement crisis of 1928
 Russia in Flames: War, Revolution, Civil War, 1914–1921
 Russia in Revolution: An Empire in Crisis, 1890 to 1928
 The Russian Revolution: A New History
 A People's Tragedy: The Russian Revolution: 1891-1924

References

Notes

Citations

External links
 
 

2017 non-fiction books
Books about communism
Books about the Russian Revolution
Oxford University Press books